Faisal Malik is an Indian Actor, best known for his role of Prahladcha (for chacha) "Prahlad" Pandey in Amazon Prime Video's Panchayat, Fraud saiyan, Black Widows and Anurgag Kashyap's Gangs of Wasseypur Part 2. He will be next seen in Ariyippu which has been directed by Mahesh Narayanan, this will be his Malayalam debut. He has acted in various upcoming web-series such as CA Topper Tribhuvan Mishra.

Early life 
Faisal Malik hails from Allahabad (now known as Prayagraj) and left the city to become an actor in Bollywood. He has worked as an assistant director, promo producer, reality show producer, and line producer.

Career 
While Malik had a brief stint at acting in the 2012 film Gangs of Wasseypur, he gained fame after his role as Prahlad in the web-series Panchayat. 

He has co-produced web-series such as ‘Smoke’, ‘Revolver Rani’ and ‘Main aur Charles’.

References

1980 births
Living people
Indian male television actors
21st-century Indian male actors